Rohan Ferguson (born 6 December 1997) is a Scottish footballer who plays as a goalkeeper for NIFL Premiership club Larne, having previously played for Airdrieonians,  Motherwell, Queen of the South and Linfield on loan.

Career

Airdrieonians
After stepping out the pro-youth system for several years to play for Scottish Juniors club Bathgate Thistle, Ferguson then signed for Airdrieonians on 15 August 2013.

Ferguson formed part of the Diamonds youth team before making his first-team debut, at the age of seventeen, on the last day of the 2014-15 season versus Dunfermline at the Excelsior Stadium. Although considered back-up keeper to Airdrie's number one keeper Neil Parry in the 2015-16 season, his reputation was growing and on the eve of the Diamonds Scottish Cup 4th round match with Dundee United in January 2016, the Tannadice club launched a bid for the player that was rejected by the Diamonds.

The Terrors had a further bid rejected before another of Ferguson's former clubs, Hearts showed interest, as Ferguson spent time on trial with the Tynecastle club, as Airdrie's manager Eddie Wolecki Black said: “Rohan is recognised now as one of the hottest young prospects in the game. He sparkled in our recent 1–0 Scottish Cup defeat by Dundee United and relished the experience of training with Hearts. We will need to see what develops in the months to come.”

Ferguson then signed a new two-year contract, as Airdrie turned full-time and with Parry no longer at the club, Ferguson was the new number one keeper for the 2016-17 season, as he won the League One player of the month award for November 2016. Fergsuon completed the season with the Diamonds having played 45 matches but couldn't help his club to promotion after they lost to Alloa in the play-off semi final.

Motherwell
On Friday 18 August 2017, Ferguson signed for Motherwell on a three-year contract, although he was immediately sent back out on loan to Airdrie for the remainder of the 2017–2018 season. Youngsters Jake Hastie and Luke Watt were also sent out on loan to Airdrie as part of the deal. Ferguson played a further 24 matches for Airdrie on loan and ended up with 80 appearances for the Diamonds.

Ferguson's first competitive match for Motherwell was in the Scottish Challenge Cup, appearing for Well's Colts team versus East Stirlingshire at the Falkirk Stadium. On 3 April 2019, Ferguson debuted for the first-team, appearing as a substitute for the injured Mark Gillespie in a 3–1 defeat versus Aberdeen.

Linfield (Loan spell)
On 19 July 2019, Ferguson moved out on loan to Linfield for the entire 2019–20 season. Ferguson was released by Motherwell in May 2020.

Queen of the South 
On 17 September 2020, Ferguson signed a one-year deal with Scottish Championship club Queen of the South.

Larne 
On 8 June 2021, Ferguson signed a one-year deal with NIFL Premiership club Larne.

Career statistics

Honours
Linfield
NIFL Premiership: 2019–20

Larne
County Antrim Shield (2): 2021-22, 2022-23

References

1997 births
Living people
Scottish footballers
People from Bathgate
Association football goalkeepers
Airdrieonians F.C. players
Motherwell F.C. players
Linfield F.C. players
Scottish Professional Football League players
Queen of the South F.C. players